Victoria River  may refer to:

Places

Antarctica
Victoria River, Antarctica, a watercourse in the McMurdo Dry Valley

Australia

Northern Territory
 Victoria River, Northern Territory, a locality
Victoria River (Northern Territory), a river 
Victoria River Downs Station, a cattle station  
Victoria River Downs Airport, an airport

Victoria
Victoria River (Victoria), a watercourse

Canada
Victoria River (Newfoundland), a watercourse in Newfoundland and Labrador
Victoria River (lake Mégantic), a watercourse of Chaudière watershed in Quebec

New Zealand
Victoria River, New Zealand, a watercourse in New Zealand

See also
Victoria River Downs (disambiguation)